This list of historical markers installed by the National Historical Commission of the Philippines (NHCP) in Ilocos Region is an annotated list of people, places, or events in the region that have been commemorated by cast-iron plaques issued by the said commission. The plaques themselves are permanent signs installed in publicly visible locations on buildings, monuments, or in special locations.

While many Cultural Properties have historical markers installed, not all places marked with historical markers are designated into one of the particular categories of Cultural Properties.

Delayed negotiations with the family that owns Casa Hacienda prompted the local government of Bautista to install the marker where Filipinas/Lupang Hinirang was composed to the town's plaza instead.

The historical marker commemorating the centennial birth anniversary of the late dictator and president Ferdinand Marcos in Batac, Ilocos Norte, unveiled on September 11, 2017, became controversial, as the NHCP earlier opposed the late strongman's burial at the Libingan ng mga Bayani. Baybayin, an Ateneo de Manila student organization, issued an alternative marker online containing atrocities under the Marcos regime, as well as his burial. The said online marker became a statement against historical revisionism.

This article lists one hundred three (103) markers from the Ilocos Region

Ilocos Norte
This article lists thirty-nine (39) markers from the Province of Ilocos Norte.

Ilocos Sur
This article lists thirty-four (34) markers from the province ooI locos Sur.

La Union
This article lists twelve (12) markers from the Province of La Union.

Pangasinan
This article lists eighteen (18) markers from the Province of Pangasinan.

See also
List of Cultural Properties of the Philippines in the Ilocos Region

References

Footnotes

Bibliography 

A list of sites and structures with historical markers, as of 16 January 2012
A list of institutions with historical markers, as of 16 January 2012

External links
A list of sites and structures with historical markers, as of 16 January 2012
A list of institutions with historical markers, as of 16 January 2012
National Registry of Historic Sites and Structures in the Philippines
Policies on the Installation of Historical Markers

Ilocos
Ilocos Region